George Dayton (October 2, 1827 – November 1902) was a New Jersey merchant and politician.

Dayton lived in Union Township in what is now Rutherford, New Jersey, where he was a successful hardware merchant. He was elected as a Democrat to represent Bergen County in the New Jersey Senate for one term from 1875 to 1877. Dayton "dropped out of sight after his term in the Senate", moving to Closter, in 1890 and becoming the clerk of Harrington Township, New Jersey.

George Dayton was the great grandson of Jonathan Dayton and great great grandson of Elias Dayton.  Dayton had a brother, Jesse C. Dayton, who happened to serve in the New York State Senate at the same time as his own service in the New Jersey Senate.

Dayton died in 1902, at the age of 75, after an illness of several months. He was buried in Brookside Cemetery on November 20, 1902.

References

1827 births
Democratic Party New Jersey state senators
People from Closter, New Jersey
People from Rutherford, New Jersey
Politicians from Bergen County, New Jersey
1902 deaths
19th-century American politicians